Learning to Love is a 1925 American comedy film directed by Sidney Franklin and written by John Emerson and Anita Loos. The film stars Constance Talmadge, Antonio Moreno, Emily Fitzroy, Edythe Chapman, John Harron, and Ray Hallor. The film was released on January 25, 1925, by First National Pictures.

Cast

Preservation
A print of Learning to Love is in the collection of the Library of Congress.

References

External links

 

1925 films
1920s English-language films
Silent American comedy films
1926 comedy films
1926 films
First National Pictures films
Films directed by Sidney Franklin
American silent feature films
American black-and-white films
1925 comedy films
1920s American films